Jelena Janković defeated Dinara Safina in the final, 6–2, 6–2 to win the women's singles tennis title at the 2007 Charleston Open.
Nadia Petrova was the defending champion, but she chose not to participate.

Seeds
The top 8 seeds received a bye into the second round.

Draw

Finals

Section 1

Section 2

Section 3

Section 4

External links
 

Charleston Open
Family Circle Cup